The Portugal Open (formerly named Estoril Open) was an ATP and WTA clay court tennis tournament in Portugal. The event took place at the sports complex of Jamor in Oeiras, of which Estoril Court Central is the most prominent show court. In 2015, the tournament was canceled due to lack of sponsorship. A new tournament, Millennium Estoril Open, was created in its place, moving from Oeiras to Cascais.
The 2014 Portugal Open was the last edition.

History
The men's tournament was created in 1990 and has been won by several top-10 players, including former world No. 1 players Thomas Muster (1995 and 1996), Carlos Moyà (2000), Juan Carlos Ferrero (2001), Novak Djokovic (2007), and Roger Federer (2008). Also, Marat Safin lost the 2004 final and Yevgeny Kafelnikov and Gustavo Kuerten won the doubles tournament in 1995 and 1997, respectively. The men's half was part of ATP World Tour 250 series tournaments.

The women's tournament started in 1989 as the Estoril Ladies Open and was in its first two years, a separate event. After being discontinued in 1990, the event returned as a part of the Estoril Open in 1998, starting as an ITF tournament. In the following year it became a WTA tournament again. The women's tournament is currently an International Series tournament. No former world No. 1 has ever won the women's tournament but Victoria Azarenka was runner-up in 2007.

Statistically, the men's tournament highlights the dominance of Argentine and Spanish male players on red clay. Between 1990 and 2001, at least one Spaniard appeared in the final ten times, with a player from Spain claiming the title in nine of those twelve years. The Spanish dominance waned in recent years. Since 2001, there have only been three Spaniards in four finals with two victories. Between 2002 and 2006, an Argentine made the final at Estoril, winning four of these five titles. The Argentine streak returned in 2011 with the first of three more victories in four years.

The roll of champions on the women's side is more diverse. Twelve of the seventeen different champions have represented a nation that had not previously won it. Despite this, Spain is still, although slightly, the most dominant nation. The women's tournament is a popular spot for players to win their first title; since it became a WTA event again in 1999, six players have used it to win their maiden title. In 2006, it showcased the first all-Chinese final in tour history, between Zheng Jie and Li Na.

Only one Portuguese player has reached the final in either the men's or the women's event: Frederico Gil, the losing men's finalist in 2010.

In 2013, the organization of the tournament changed its name to "Portugal Open" in order to present the tournament as a Portuguese well-organized event.

Past finals

See also
Portuguese International Championships

References

External links

 
 ATP profile
 WTA profile

 
Defunct tennis tournaments in Europe
WTA Tour
Recurring sporting events established in 1990
Recurring sporting events disestablished in 2014
1990 establishments in Portugal